Xerxes may refer to:

People
 Xerxes I of Persia, "Xerxes the Great", reigned 486–465 BC
 Xerxes II of Persia, briefly reigned 424 BC
 Xerxes of Sophene, ruler of Sophene and Commagene, 228–201 BC
 Xerxes (Sasanian prince), 6th-century prince and general
 Xerxes (name), a list of people with the name

Fiction, stage and video
Il Xerse, (in its 1660 French version, Xerxès), Francesco Cavalli's opera of 1654
Xerse, Giovanni Bononcini's opera of 1694
Serse (Xerxes), George Frideric Handel's opera of 1738
Xerxes, novel by Louis Couperus
Xerxes (TV series), a Swedish TV series for children
Xerxes (graphic novel), a 2018 graphic novel by Frank Miller

Other
Xerxes The God-King, a 2010 album by American rapper King Gordy
Xerxes Peak, a mountain in the Canadian Rockies
XerxesDZB, a Dutch professional football team based in Rotterdam
Roksan Xerxes, a series of record turntables from Roksan Audio (UK)
XerXeS, a denial-of-service attack tool developed by The Jester
 XERXES, a computer AI in System Shock 2
Xerxes, a 1994 album by Arcwelder
Heterocoma or Xerxes, a genus of flowering plants in the aster family

See also
Ahasuerus, a related name used in the Hebrew Bible, legends and Apocrypha
Artaxerxes I of Persia, reigned 465–424 BC
Xerces (disambiguation)